Lapsis is a 2020 science fiction film written and directed by Noah Hutton. The film premiered at the 2020 Bucheon International Fantastic Film Festival.

Premise 
In a parallel present, delivery man Ray Tincelli is struggling to support himself and his ailing younger brother. After a series of 2-bit hustles and unsuccessful swindles, Ray takes a job in a strange new realm of the gig economy: trekking deep into the forest, pulling cable over miles of terrain to connect large, metal cubes that link together the new quantum trading market. As he gets pulled deeper into the zone, he encounters growing hostility and the threat of robot cablers, and must choose to either help his fellow workers or to get rich and get out.

Cast 
 Dean Imperial as Ray
 Babe Howard as Ray's ill younger brother
 Madeline Wise as Anna

Reception 
Phil Hoad of The Guardian gave the film three out of five stars. Dennis Harvey for Variety praised the film as a 'clever' satire of the gig economy. Hutton was nominated for Best First Screenplay at the 36th Independent Spirit Awards.

On Rotten Tomatoes, Lapsis has an approval rating of 95% based on 58 reviews. The site’s critics consensus reads, "Lapsis binds economic anxiety to an unsettling sci-fi story set in the not-too-distant future, with smartly inventive results."

References

External links 
 
 
 

2020 films
2020 science fiction films
American science fiction films
2020s English-language films
2020s American films
2020 independent films